This is a list of radio stations in Palestine.

FM

FM broadcasting 
 All for Peace
 Palestinian Broadcasting Corporation
 RAM FM (West Bank)
 Voice of Palestine

See also
Media of Palestine

Notes

External links

Radio stations
Palestine